Raivis is a masculine Latvian given name, a variant of Raivo, the Estonian form of Robert. It may refer to:

Raivis Belohvoščiks (born 1976), Latvian cyclist
Raivis Broks (born 1982), Latvian bobsledder
Raivis Dzintars (born 1982), Latvian journalist and politician
Raivis Hščanovičs (born 1987), Latvian footballer
Raivis Jurkovskis (born 1996), Latvian footballer 
Raivis Vidzis (born 1976), Latvian strongman competitor
Raivis Zeltīts (born 1992), Latvian politician

Latvian masculine given names